Papenholz is a city-district of Witten-Heven, which is a part of the City of Witten, (North Rhine-Westphalia, Germany). Papenholz is placed about 3 kilometres northwest of the city. It has nearly no population. It is neither known when it was firstly  nor who were the first settlers; it is a part of Witten-Heven since 1929. Before 1929 it belonged to Langendreer.

Witten
Neighbourhoods in Germany